Cassano Magnago Handball Club is an Italian handball club from Cassano Magnago established in 1974. It is best known for its women's team, which played in the Serie A1 between 1982 and 2002, and dominated the competition for a decade, winning a record eleven titles in a row between 1986 and 1996. In 1990 it reached the Champions League's quarterfinals. Nowadays the team plays in the second tier.

Titles
 Serie A1
 1986, 1987, 1988, 1989, 1990, 1991, 1992, 1993, 1994, 1995, 1996
 Coppa Italia
 1988, 1995

European record

References

Sport in Lombardy
Italian handball clubs